Leonard Weinrib (April 29, 1935 – June 28, 2006) was an American actor, comedian and writer. He is best known for playing the title role in the children's television show H.R. Pufnstuf, Grimace in McDonaldland commercials, the title role in Inch High, Private Eye, the original voice of Scrappy-Doo on Scooby-Doo and Scrappy-Doo, Hunk and Prince Lotor on Voltron, and Bigmouth on The Smurfs. He also was the voice for Timer in the "Time for Timer" ABC public service announcements in the early 1970s.

Life and career
A native of the Bronx, Weinrib got his start in show business working with Spike Jones, then later in The Billy Barnes Revue. He made guest appearances on The Dick Van Dyke Show, The Many Loves of Dobie Gillis, Burke's Law, The Munsters, Happy Days and Adam-12.
He charted nationally (Music Vendor, #132) with the comedy single "Prez Conference" in 1962. He also guest starred in an Emergency! episode called "Firehouse Four" as Fred Gibson, an overweight, accident-prone man. Woody Allen's character in his 1995 film Mighty Aphrodite was named "Lenny Weinrib".

Voice actor
He was most notable for his voice acting work. Starting with The Jetsons, Weinrib provided numerous voices for such animated series as Inch High, Private Eye, The New Adventures of Batman, Tarzan and the Super 7, and Hong Kong Phooey. He was the voice for both Roland and Ratfink in that series of cartoon shorts. He also provided the voice of Timer in the 1970s "Time for Timer" series of educational spots shown on the ABC network. In Voltron: Defender of the Universe, he voiced both Hunk and the villain Prince Lotor in the "Lion Voltron series", as well as Captain Newley and Cliff in the "Vehicle Voltron" series. He also voiced a secretary bird and king Leonidas the lion in the animated sequence of the film Bedknobs and Broomsticks. Another Disney role Weinrib voiced was an evil sorcerer named Zorlok for an episode of Disney's Adventures of the Gummi Bears. He also voices the school bully Lenny Warthog on the NBC series Kissyfur.

He also lent his voice to Superman in 1970 for a Sesame Street sketch of a lecture about words beginning with "S" which happened to be the character's favorite letter of the alphabet. Weinrib again voiced the Man of Steel, and his alter-ego Clark Kent, for a 1972 episode of The Brady Kids, "Cindy's Super Friend".

Weinrib voiced Davey Jones' Uncle Sedgwick, Hotel Desk Clerk and Shaggy's Great-Uncle Nathaniel on The New Scooby-Doo Movies. He voiced Cap'n Noah Smitty in Yogi's Ark Lark. He also was the original voice of Scrappy-Doo on the Scooby-Doo and Scrappy-Doo TV series before Don Messick took over the role.

He voiced the title role in H.R. Pufnstuf throughout the show's entire run from 1969 through 1971, and also wrote every episode of the series. He also appeared as H.R. Pufnstuf as a guest on The Dating Game in Christmas 1972 and on one episode of the TV show CHiPs in 1977. On The Krofft Supershow, he played the title character in Magic Mongo.

He did the voices for Moonrock and Sergeant Boulder on The Flintstone Comedy Show. In 1986, he was the original voice of Freddy Flintstone on The Flintstone Kids, before Scott Menville replaced him the following season. In 1991, he voiced Max the Mole on the all-star Hanna-Barbera animated series Yo Yogi!.

Live action
Weinrib appeared on The Dick Van Dyke Show three times, each time playing a similar character, a loud, over-the-top, insult-type comedian. This character was named "Jackie Brewster" ("Buddy Can You Spare a Job", 1961), "Danny Brewster" ("The Sam Pomerantz Scandals", 1963), and "Phil Franklin" ("The Impractical Joke", 1965).

He also appeared on single episodes of The Man From U.N.C.L.E. ("Winky Blintz" in "The Off-Broadway Affair", 1966) Happy Days ("Duke" in "Ritchie's Cup Runneth Over", 1974), and on two episodes of Adam-12 in 1973 and 1974 as Tony the police garage mechanic. He also guest starred in the 1974 Emergency! episode called "Firehouse Four" as Fred Gibson.

Directing
Weinrib's directing career consists of three feature films, all in the beach party genre: Beach Ball for Paramount in 1965, and Wild Wild Winter and Out of Sight, both for Universal in 1966. Weinrib also co-wrote the 1963 joke book The Elephant Book.

Retirement and death
Weinrib retired from acting in the 1990s and moved to Santiago, Chile.

For the Family Guy episode "Petarded", Seth MacFarlane explained on the Season 4 DVD commentary he wanted to use Weinrib to voice Timer for a cutaway gag, but Weinrib was suffering from failing health when "Petarded" was being produced, and as MacFarlane explained, he "didn't remember doing it" after the recorded audio was played back for him later. In the end, Timer was voiced by Seth himself.

Weinrib died in a hospital near his home on June 28, 2006, after suffering a stroke.

Family
Weinrib's elder daughter Linda Weinrib and grandchildren Lauren Bendik and Steven Bendik are voice actors. His younger daughter Heidi Weinrib has performed as part of the ensemble cast of Rojo de Chile, a Chilean talent competition broadcast by Television Nacional de Chile. His youngest daughter Grace Weinrib is an artist and also lives in Santiago, Chile as does their mother Sonia.

Filmography

Voices
 H.R. Pufnstuf - Voices of H.R. Pufnstuf, Orson Vulture, Stupid Bat, Hippie Tree, Bela Lugosi Tree, Dr. Blinky's Talking Book, Alarm Clock, Polka Dotted Horse, Pop Lolly, West Wind
 Lidsville - Voices of Mr. Big, Colonel Poom, Captain Hooknose, Rah Rah, Mr. Chow, Tex, Tonsilini, Pierre LeSewer
 The Krofft Superstar Hour - Voices of H.R. Pufnstuf, Orson Vulture, Stupid Bat
 The Skatebirds - Voice of Knock-Knock the Woodpecker ("Skatebirds" segment)
 Barnyard Commandos - Additional Voices
 Buford and the Galloping Ghost - Additional Voices
 CB Bears - King, Rattle, Yukayuka
 Dr. Dolittle - Sam Scurvy, various
 Dynomutt, Dog Wonder - Roto Chopper
 Foofur - Additional Voices 
 Fred Flintstone and Friends - Additional Voices
 Fraidy Cat - Voices of Elefunt, Kitty Wizard, Captain Kitt, Sir Walter Cat, Billy the Kit, Eddie Kittenbacker, and Hep Cat
 Galaxy Goof-Ups - Additional Voices
 Garfield and Friends - Additional Voices
 Help!... It's the Hair Bear Bunch! - Additional Voices 
 Hong Kong Phooey - Additional Voices
 Inch High, Private Eye - Inch High
 Jabberjaw - Additional Voices
 Jokebook - Additional Voices
 Kissyfur - Charles, Lennie
 Mork & Mindy/Laverne & Shirley/Fonz Hour - Additional Voices
 My Little Pony and Friends - Additional Voices
 Pac-Man - Additional Voices
 Rambo: The Force of Freedom - Gripper
 Scooby and Scrappy-Doo - Scrappy-Doo, Bill Walker, Neon Phantom
 Space Cats - Additional Voices
 Space Stars - Dipper
 The Addams Family - Gomez Addams
 Adventures of the Gummi Bears - Additional Voices
 The Adventures of Don Coyote and Sancho Panda - Additional Voices
 The Brady Kids - Superman/Clark Kent
 The All-New Popeye Hour - Additional Voices
 The Amazing Chan and the Chan Clan - Stanley Chan
 The Most Important Person - Various Voices
 The Flintstone Comedy Hour - Announcer, Moonrock
 The Flintstone Comedy Show - Moonrock, Sgt. Boulder
 The Flintstone Kids - Freddy Flintstone (1986-1987), Commissioner
 The Flintstones Meet Rockula and Frankenstone - TV special - Mr. Silika
 The Further Adventures of SuperTed - Additional Voices 
 The Great Grape Ape Show - Additional Voices
 The Hoober-Bloob Highway - Additional Voices
 The Jetsons - Additional Voices (1985-1987)
 The Kwicky Koala Show - Additional Voices
 The Little Rascals - Additional Voices
 The Mumbly Cartoon Show - Additional Voices
 The New Adventures of Batman - Joker, Clayface, Mr. Freeze, Chameleon, Moonman, Professor Bubbles, Sweet Tooth, Zarbor, Penguin, Electro, Commissioner Gordon. 
 The New Scooby and Scrappy-Doo Show - Griff, Mickey Hack, Gremlin, Additional Voices
 The New Scooby-Doo Movies - Sedgwick Jones, Hotel Desk Clerk, Great-Uncle Nathaniel, Additional Voices
 The Pebbles and Bamm-Bamm Show - Bronto, Moonrock
 The Pink Panther Laugh and a Half Hour and a Half Show - Additional Voices
 The Plastic Man Comedy/Adventure Show - Additional Voices
 The Scooby-Doo Show - Squire Marley, Grey Fox, Additional Voices
 The Scooby & Scrappy-Doo/Puppy Hour - Additional Voices
 The Smurfs - Bigmouth, Additional Voices
 The Smurfic Games - TV special - Bigmouth
 The Super Globetrotters - Additional Voices
 The Tom and Jerry Show - Dinky, Additional Voices
 The Tom and Jerry Comedy Show - Additional Voices
 These Are the Days - Additional Voices
 Trollkins - Additional Voices 
 Uncle Croc's Block - Elephunt Cave Cat, Billy the Kit, Captain Eddie Kittenbakker, Captain Kitt, Jasper Catdaver, Kitty Wizard, Sir Walter Cat, Hep Cat ("Fraidy Cat" segments)
 Voltron - Hunk Garrett, Prince Lotor (Lion Force series); Cliff, Captain Newley (Vehicle Force series)
 Wait Till Your Father Gets Home - Chet Boyle
 Walt Disney's Wonderful World of Color - Additional Voices
 Wheelie and the Chopper Bunch - Hi-Riser
 Yo Yogi! - Max the Mole
 Yogi's Gang - Smokestack Smog
 Yogi's Space Race - Additional Voices
 Yogi's Treasure Hunt - Additional Voices

Live-action
 The Dick Van Dyke Show - 3 episodes (1961, 1963, 1965)
 Don't Call Me Charlie! - 1 episode ("Who Stole My Boots?") as a shoemaker (1962)
 My Favorite Martian - 1 episode as Dentist Dr. Herbie Little (1964)
 The Man From U.N.C.L.E. - 1 episode as Winky Blintz (1966) "The Off-Broadway Affair"
 Happy Days - "Duke", 1 episode (1974)
 The Krofft Supershow - as the title character in the "Magic Mongo" segment (1977–78)
 Laredo - episode - The Sweet Gang - Bud Sweet
 Adam-12 - 2 episodes as a Police garage mechanic
 Emergency! - episode - Firehouse Four - Fred Gibson
 The Munsters - episode - "The Midnight Ride of Herman Munster" - Freddie (1964)
 The Twilight Zone - 1 episode - "Miniature" - Buddy Russell (1963)
 Alfred Hitchcock Presents - 3 episodes as Amos, Harry, Stanley (1960-1962)
 The Red Skelton Show - 1 episode as Ronnie (1959)
 The Waltons - episode - The Marathon S3E10 - as Spanky (1974)

Films
 Tales of Terror (1962) - Policeman (segment "The Black Cat")
 The Thrill of It All (1963) - Truck Driver
 It's a Mad, Mad, Mad, Mad World (1963) - F-14 / Ladder Fireman (voice, uncredited)
 Not with My Wife, You Don't! (1966) - Green Eyed Monster of Jealousy (voice, uncredited)
 Out of Sight (1966, Director)
 Good Times (1967) - Leslie Garth
 Gas! -Or- It Became Necessary to Destroy the World in Order to Save It. (1970) - (voice, uncredited)
 The Point! (1971) - Count (voice)
 Bedknobs and Broomsticks (1971) - Secretary Bird / King Leonidas (voice)
 Yogi's Ark Lark (1972) - Cap'n Noah Smitty
 The Adventures of Robin Hoodnik (1972) - Robin Hoodnik / Alan Airedale / Whirlin' Merlin / Lord Scurvy / Friar Pork / Little John (voice)
 Tabitha and Adam and the Clown Family (1972) - Big Louie / Count Krumley / Mr. McGuffin (voice)
 The Magical Mystery Trip Through Little Red's Head (1974) - Timer / All Other Voices (voice)
 Rikki-Tikki-Tavi (1975, TV Short) - Darzee the Tailorbird
 The Strongest Man in the World (1975) - State Coach
 Shogun Assassin (1980) - (voice)
 Bugs Bunny's 3rd Movie: 1001 Rabbit Tales (1982) - Prince Abadaba (voice)
 The Adventures of Ronald McDonald: McTreasure Island (1990, Short) - Grimace / The Captain / Pirates (voice)

Commercials
 McDonald's McDonaldland Commercials - Grimace (1971-1986) / Uncle O'Grimacey (voice)
 Time for Timer - Timer
 Cookie Crisp - Cookie Jarvis
 Super Friends - network promo "Meet... Super-Friends!" narrator for series premiere on ABC-TV September 1973

See also

References

External links
 
 
 

1935 births
2006 deaths
American expatriates in Chile
American male television actors
American male voice actors
Hanna-Barbera people
Jewish American comedians
Jewish American male actors
Jewish American male comedians
Male actors from New York City
People from the Bronx
20th-century American male actors
20th-century American Jews
21st-century American Jews